"Keep It Turned On" is a song by English singer Rick Astley, released in 2002 only in Germany and the United States as a promo single. The song was the second and final single from his fifth studio album of the same name.

Track listing
5" CD single
"Keep It Turned On" (Single Version) – 3:47
"Keep It Turned On" (Remix) – 3:46
5" CD single promo
"Keep It Turned On" (Album Version) – 3:57
"Keep It Turned On" (Single Version) – 3:48
Unreleased 5" CD single
"Keep It Turned On" (Booya Mix) – 4:43
"One Night Stand" – 4:10

Credits
Written by Rick Astley and Chris Braide
Published by Cruz Music and Warner Chappell
Produced by Rick Astley and Chris Braide
Lead vocal, backing vocals, programming and guitars by Rick Astley
Backing vocals, keyboards, piano and guitars: Chris Braide
Recorded by Dan Frampton and Rick Astley
Mixed by Dan Frampton

References

External links
Keep It Turned On (album) in Rickastley.co.uk

2001 songs
2001 singles
Rick Astley songs
Songs written by Chris Braide
Songs written by Rick Astley
Polydor Records singles
Song recordings produced by Chris Braide